Hemp fiber, seed and oil can be used for a number of products.

Food products
Hemp juice
Hemp milk
Hemp protein
Maltos-Cannabis

Construction and materials
Fiber reinforced plastic
Hempcrete
Oakum

Medicine
Cannabis (drug)
CBG oil
Medical cannabis

Raw fiber
Hemp fiber

Fuel
Hemp oil can be used to make biodiesel
Alcohol fuel

Other
Hemp hurds
Hemp jewelry
Paper
Sleeves for tablet computers

Notes

References
 
 
 
 
 

Cannabis-related lists